Juan Miguel "Mikey" Macapagal Arroyo (born April 26, 1969), is a Filipino politician and former actor serving as the Representative of Pampanga's 2nd district since 2019, and previously from 2004 to 2010. He previously served as the vice governor of Pampanga from 2001 to 2004. Born into the Macapagal family of Pampanga, his mother, Gloria Macapagal Arroyo, served as the 14th president of the Philippines, while his grandfather, Diosdado Macapagal, was the 9th president.

Controversies

In August 2009, Vera Files, a group of veteran Filipino journalists, reported that Arroyo "has failed to declare in his Statement of Assets, Liabilities and Networth (SALN) for the last two years a $1.32 million or P63.7 million beachfront property in the San Francisco Bay Area in California, which he bought and then transferred to his wife Angela in 2006." The house is located in Beach Park Blvd in Foster City in San Mateo County. He defended himself by saying that the money he used in acquiring these properties came from cash gifts he received for his wedding as well as from campaign contributions.

Nearly two years later, the Bureau of Internal Revenue filed tax evasion charges against Arroyo and his wife Angela for not filing income tax returns for the years 2005, 2008 and 2009. BIR Chief Kim Jacinto-Henares mentioned that based on the documents her agency had obtained, the couple owes the government P73.85 million in unpaid taxes. Arroyo lawyer Ruy Rondain questioned the timing of the filing of these charges.

On July 10, 2020, Arroyo is among the 70 representatives who voted "yes" to reject the franchise renewal of ABS-CBN, the Philippine's largest television network. Two months later, he proposed the suggestion to postpone the 2022 Philippine elections due to the COVID-19 pandemic.

Filmography
Anak Pagsubok Lamang (1996)
Hawak Ko Buhay Mo (1997)
Tapatan ng Tapang (1997)
Ang Maton at ang Showgirl (1998)
Ang Boyfriend Kong Pari (1999)
Largado, Ibabalik Kita sa Pinanggalingan Mo! (1999)
Ako'y Ibigin Mo, Lalaking Matapang (1999)
Di Ko Kayang Tanggapin (2000)
Super Idol (2001)
Mahal Kita... Kahit Sino Ka Pa (2001)
Di Kita Ma-Reach (2001)
Walang Iba Kundi Ikaw (2002)
A.B. Normal College (Todo Na 'Yan, Kulang Pa 'Yun) (2003)
Masamang Ugat (2003)
Sablay Ka Na, Pasaway Ka Pa (2005)

Ancestry

References

VERA Files Accessed: April 27, 2011

External links

|-

|-

1969 births
Living people
Mikey
Ateneo de Manila University alumni
Children of presidents of the Philippines
Filipino actor-politicians
Filipino Roman Catholics
Hiligaynon people
Kapampangan people
Lakas–CMD politicians
Macapagal family
Male actors from Pampanga
Members of the House of Representatives of the Philippines from Pampanga
Members of the Pampanga Provincial Board
Party-list members of the House of Representatives of the Philippines
People from Quezon City
University of California, Berkeley alumni